The 1981 Langs Supreme Scottish Masters was the inaugural edition of the professional invitational snooker tournament, which took place from 22 to 25 September 1981.
The tournament was played at the Kelvin Hall in Glasgow, Scotland, and featured nine professional players.

Summary
One preliminary match was played between Vic Harris, the winner of the 1981 English Amateur Championship who had recently turned professional, and Ian Black, the winner of the 1981 Scottish Professional Championship.

Jimmy White beat Ray Reardon 5–4 in the first quarter-final while Steve Davis beat Doug Mountjoy 5–0, including a break of 108. On the second day Vic Harris won his preliminary match 4–0 and then lost 3–5 to Alex Higgins. Cliff Thorburn beat Kirk Stevens 5–1 in the other quarter-final, including a break of 111 by Thorburn.

In the semi-finals Jimmy White beat Steve Davis 6–5 while Cliff Thorburn beat Alex Higgins 6–2.

Jimmy White won the first title of his professional career, beating Cliff Thorburn 9–4 in the final. Thorburn led 3–0 and 4–1 but then White won eight frames in succession to win the title and the £8,000 first prize.

Tournament draw

One preliminary match was played, with the winner advancing to face Alex Higgins in the quarter-finals; this match was played under a best-of-seven frames format.
 4–0

Final

Century breaks

 111  Cliff Thorburn
 108  Steve Davis

References

Scottish Masters
Scottish Masters
Masters
Scottish Masters